Mari El, officially the Mari El Republic, is a republic of Russia. It is in the European Russia region of the country, along the northern bank of the Volga River, and is administratively part of the Volga Federal District. The republic has a population of 696,459 (2010 Census). Yoshkar-Ola is the capital and the largest city.

Mari El is one of Russia's ethnic republics, established for the indigenous Mari people, a Finnic nation who have traditionally lived along the Volga River and Kama River. The majority of the republic's population are ethnic Russians (47.4%) and Mari (43.9%), with minority populations of Tatars and Chuvash. The official languages are Russian and Mari. Mari El is bordered by Nizhny Novgorod Oblast to the west, Kirov Oblast to the north, Tatarstan to the east, and Chuvashia to the south.

Geography

The Republic is located in the eastern part of the East European Plain of Russia, along and mostly to the north of the Volga River. The swampy Mari Depression is in the west of the Republic, contrasted by more hilly landscapes in the east where the highest point of the Republic (at ) is located. The Republic borders with Kirov Oblast in the north and east, the Republic of Tatarstan in the southeast and south, the Chuvash Republic in the south, and with Nizhny Novgorod Oblast in the west and north.

There are 476 rivers in the Republic, with the Volga and its tributaries being the major water arteries. Lake Yalchik, occupying , is the largest by area, while Lake Tabashinskoye is the deepest. Swamps cover large areas— and up to —and usually freeze in December.

Climate is moderately continental, with moderately cold and snowy winters and warm and often rainy summers. November is the windiest month of the year.

There are virtually no natural resources of industrial significance in the Republic. Other resources include peat, mineral waters, and limestone. About 50% of the Republic's territory is forested, although the level of forestation varies significantly from one district to another.

History

Ancient Mari tribes were known since the 5th century, though archaeologists suspect that the Mari culture is much older in its roots. Later their area was a tributary of Volga Bulgaria and the Golden Horde. In the 1440s it was incorporated into the Khanate of Kazan and was occupied by the Tsardom of Russia (governed by Ivan the Terrible) after the fall of Kazan in 1552.

After the Russian Revolution, under the Bolshevik regime, the Mari Autonomous Oblast was established on 4 November 1920. It was re-organized into the Mari ASSR on 5 December 1936, at the same time as the enactment of the 1936 Soviet Constitution. In its present form, the Mari El Republic was formed on 22 December 1990. On 21 May 1998, Mari El alongside Amur, Ivanovo, Kostroma, and Voronezh Oblast signed a power-sharing agreement with the federal government, granting it autonomy. This agreement was abolished on 31 December 2001.

Administrative divisions

Politics

The head of government in the Mari El Republic is the Head (formerly President). As of 2017, the Head was Alexander Yevstifeyev, who was appointed in April 2017.

The government of Mari El has been pursuing Russification in recent years, with the former head of the republic, Leonid Markelov, ordering many Mari language newspapers to close.  Many ethnic Mari activists live in fear of violence. The Mari activist and chief editor Vladimir Kozlov was badly beaten after he criticized Markelov's government. Other Mari leaders have been subject to violence, legal persecution, and intimidation.

The Mari people's native religion, based on the worship of the forces of nature, has encountered hostility as well. Vitaly Tanakov was charged with inciting religious, national, social, and linguistic hatred after publishing the book The Priest Speaks.

The International Helsinki Federation for Human Rights (IHF) and the Moscow Helsinki Group (MHG), in an exhaustive 2006 report Russian Federation: The Human Rights Situation of the Mari Minority of the Republic of Mari El, found widespread evidence of political and cultural persecution of Mari people, and of "a broader trend of repression of dissidents in the republic".

Demographics
Population:

Vital statistics
Source: Russian Federal State Statistics Service 

Note: Total fertility rate source.

Ethnic groups

Though the Mari people have lived in the area for millennia, they did not have a designated territory before the Russian Revolution of 1917. According to the 2002 Census, only 51.7% of the Mari within Russia live in the Mari El Republic, while 17.5% live in the Republic of Bashkortostan (consisting of the Eastern Mari, who fled to Bashkorostan to escape religious persecution). During the last Soviet Census (1989), 4% of the Mari of the Soviet Union lived outside of Russia.

Since World War II, more ethnic Russians and Tatars have moved into the area. According to the 2010 Census, Russians make up 47.4% of the republic's population, while the ethnic Mari make up 43.9%. Other groups include Tatars (5.8%), Chuvash (0.9%), Ukrainians (0.6%), and a host of smaller groups, each accounting for less than 0.5% of the total population.

Religion

The religions with the most adherents in the republic are Russian Orthodoxy, the Mari native religion, the Old Believers, and Islam. The traditional Mari religion (Chimari yula) is still practised today by many Mari people and is the main religion of the Mari of Bashkortostan; also practised is a syncretism with Christianity. The Czars took drastic measures to force Christianity on the Mari, going so far as blowing up a holy mountain, and the persecution of the religion went on under the Soviet Union.

During the 1990s the religion was officially recognized by the State and began to revive. The Mari gather at around 520 holy groves where they offer animal and vegetable sacrifices, there are about 20 festivals yearly. Although traditional religion is one of Mari El's three officially recognized religions (along with Orthodoxy and Islam) Mari religious practises have come under increasing pressure, according to human rights groups.

According to a 2012 survey, 47.8% of the population of Mari El adheres to the Russian Orthodox Church, 6–15% adheres to the Mari native religion, 6% adheres to Islam, 4% are unaffiliated generic Christians, 1% are Old Believers and 1% are Orthodox Christian believers without church affiliation or members of other Orthodox churches. In addition, 25% of the population is "spiritual but not religious", 6% is atheist and 4.2% follows other religions or did not answer the question.

Education
The most important facilities of higher education are Mari State Technical University and Mari State University, both located in Yoshkar-Ola. There are also more than 900 primary and secondary schools located throughout the republic.

For the past few years, the Mari El Republic has been participating in the national project "Education" ("Oбразование"), which is designed to improve education throughout Russia by bringing new technology into the classroom, improving material conditions in schools, and providing financial awards to extraordinary students and teachers. Although the Mari language is officially a state language, Mari educators and administrators have been forced from their positions in recent years and Mari-language education has been defunded, according to the U.S. State Department, the European Union, and others.

Economy
The most developed industries are machine construction, metalworking, timber, woodworking, and food industries. Most of the industrial enterprises are located in the capital Yoshkar-Ola, as well as in the towns of Kozmodemyansk, Volzhsk, and Zvenigovo.

The largest companies in the region include Mariysky Oil Refinery (revenues of $ million in 2017), Mari Pulp and Paper Mill ($ million), Shelanger Chemical Plant "Siver" ($ million), Marbiopharm ($ million).

Transportation
Traveling cheaply and quickly to various towns and villages within the Republic is made possible through a network of fifteen train stations, fifty-three bus stations, and numerous marshrutkas. The republic is connected to different regions throughout Russia by daily trains to and from Moscow and Kazan, flights on one commercial airline from Yoshkar-Ola Airport, located near Yoshkar-Ola, and a port on the Volga River in Kozmodemyansk. There are also four other minor river ports in the republic. Regional automobile code is 12.

Communication
Telephony, Internet service, and cable television are provided by VolgaTelecom.

Culture

There are many museums located throughout the territory of the republic. The largest ones include the National Museum, the Museum of History, and the Museum of Fine Arts in Yoshkar-Ola; the Museum of Arts and History, the Ethnographic Open-Air Museum, and the Merchant Life Museum in Kozmodemyansk; and the Sheremetyev Castle Museum-reserve in Yurino. There are also museums dedicated to the poet Nikolay Mukhin and the composer Ivan Klyuchnikov-Palantay in Yoshkar-Ola and the house-museum of writer Sergei Chavayn in Chavaynur.

Five theaters are located in Yoshkar-Ola with performances in both the Russian and Mari languages.

Notable people
Valentin Kolumb, poet
Shabdar Osyp, author
Andrei Eshpai, composer, pianist

See also
 Mari National Rebirth Party "Ushem"

Notes

References

Sources

External links

 Old Official website of the Mari El Republic
 Official website of the Mari El Republic
 Industry in the Mari El Republic
Mari El Republic nature views and sceneries
A short Meadow Mari-English dictionary
 Meadow Mari-Russian-Japanese dictionary
 About nature in Mari EL republic
Kimberli Mäkäräinen's Meadow Mari Grammar
 Map of Mari El

Further reading
Daniel Kalder.  Lost Cosmonaut: Observations of an Anti-tourist

 
States and territories established in 1936
Russian-speaking countries and territories
Regions of Europe with multiple official languages